Julian Edward Alfred Mond, 3rd Baron Melchett (9 January 1925 – 15 June 1973) was an English industrialist.

Early life
Julian Mond was the younger son of Henry Mond, 2nd Baron Melchett and Gwen Wilson. He was educated at Eton and rather than going to university joined the Fleet Air Arm in 1942. Here he served in the Atlantic and on the Russian convoys. His elder brother, Lieutenant The Honourable Derek John Henry Mond, was serving on HMS Philante when he was killed in a flying accident near Lochalsh on 30 April 1945. Thus on their father's death in 1949, Julian succeeded as 3rd Baron Melchett of Landford in the County of Southampton and 3rd Baronet of Hartford Hill in Great Budworth in the County of Chester.

Business career
After leaving the armed forces, Melchett joined Air Contractors Ltd, a subsidiary of the merchant bank M. Samuel & Co. A year later in 1948, supported by the bank, he founded a farming company based in Norfolk, British Field Products Limited, which specialised in grass-drying and animal feedstuffs. Melchett soon afterwards joined the merchant bankers M. Samuel & Co.  This company merged with Philip Hill, Higginson and Erlanger Ltd to form Hill Samuel & Co. Limited and Melchett became director in charge of the banking and overseas departments. He was also a director of the Guardian Assurance Company and of the Anglo-American Shipping Co Ltd. He was an adviser to the British Transport Docks Board, a member of the council of administration of the Malta Dockyard and on the councils of the Confederation of British Industry and the National Economic Development Council.

In 1966, Harold Wilson asked him to be chairman of a committee to plan the nationalization of the British steel industry, and from that time until his death he was effectively the chairman of what became the British Steel Corporation. This was formed from fourteen major iron and steel companies and other smaller ones who together employed more than a quarter of a million workers.

Personal and family

Melchett married Sonia Elizabeth Graham in 1947. They had one son, Peter Robert Henry Mond, and two daughters, Kerena Ann Mond and Pandora Shelley Mond. For most of their married life they lived on Tite Street in Chelsea, and on a farm, Courtyard, at Ringstead in Norfolk. They built a villa, Casa Melchett, near Formentor in Majorca and used to go for family holidays there. Lord Melchett died while on holiday there in June 1973 and was buried in the family mausoleum in St Pancras cemetery, Finchley. A memorial service was held for him in Westminster Abbey. His estate was valued at slightly over £310,000.

Coat of arms

See also
Ludwig Mond Award
Melchett Medal
Mond gas
Brunner Mond & Co.

Notes

1925 births
1973 deaths
Military personnel from Norfolk
People from Chelsea, London
People from King's Lynn and West Norfolk (district)
English Jews
English people of German-Jewish descent
British Ashkenazi Jews
People educated at Eton College
Royal Navy officers of World War II
Fleet Air Arm personnel of World War II
Businesspeople from London
English industrialists
English farmers
English landowners
Jewish British politicians
20th-century English businesspeople
Barons in the Peerage of the United Kingdom
Julian Mond ,3rd Baron Melchett